Ratkovac can refer to:

 Ratkovac (Prnjavor), a village in Bosnia and Herzegovina
 Ratkovac (Gornji Bogićevci), a village in Croatia
 Ratkovac (Lajkovac), a village in Serbia
 Ratkovac (Orahovac), a village in Kosovo